Star 101.3 may refer to:

KIOI, a Hot Adult Contemporary radio station licensed to San Francisco, California
WJKE, an Adult Contemporary radio station licensed to Stillwater, New York